The 35th Engineer Brigade is a combat engineer brigade of the United States Army National Guard of Missouri based at Fort Leonard Wood.

Originally constituted as an infantry regiment, the brigade has undergone several changes before reaching its current state. It deployed once during Operation Iraqi Freedom. Units within the brigade have deployed multiple times in support of Operation Iraqi Freedom and Operation Enduring Freedom.

Organization
As an active army national guard unit, the 35th Engineer Brigade is not a permanent formation, instead only being called upon when needed. It has a lineage to the 35th Infantry Division, which is also a part of the Kansas and Missouri Army National Guard, but it is not a part of the division at this time.

The brigade currently consists of two engineer battalions as well as several other units, in addition to its Headquarters and Headquarters Company. These units include the 1140th Engineer Battalion based in Cape Girardeau, Missouri, the 203rd Engineer Battalion, based in Joplin, Missouri.

History
Originally constituted as the 138th Infantry Regiment in 1928, the unit was reorganized and reconstituted several times, and did not receive its Shoulder Sleeve Insignia until 1984, and its Distinctive Unit Insignia in 1970. The insignia were based on those of the 35th Infantry Division, which has been the commanding unit of the brigade through the entirety of its history.

The unit was relieved on 15 April 1959 from assignment to the 35th Infantry Division; and was concurrently converted and redesignated as Headquarters and Headquarters Detachment, 101st Replacement Group. It was later reorganized and redesignated on 1 April 1963 as Combat Section, Headquarters and Headquarters Company, 35th Command Headquarters, Divisional. It was converted and consolidated 16 January 1968 with the 1135th Ordnance Company.

The 35th Engineer Brigade provides command and control of combat engineer units assigned to I Corps for worldwide missions. It also directs training of Missouri Army National Guards Engineer units to meet US Army readiness standards prior to mobilization. Prepares Missouri Engineer units for State Emergency Duties (SED) for various missions and provides units for task force missions to Joint Task Forces (JTF) conducting missions across the operational continuum.

The 35th Engineer Brigade, was tasked in late 2000, with handling much of the planning pertaining to Operation Alaskan Road. Operation Alaskan Road is a Department of Defense Innovative Readiness Training (IRT) Exercise, a USCINCPAC sponsored multi-year exercise spread over a seven-year period, with a US$33-million budget. The project aims to build a two-lane, 14.8-mile road with no more than a 7-percent grade across the island on Annette Island linking Metlakatla to the north side of the island. The project comes as fulfillment of a government promise that was originally made to Metlakatla, home of Alaska's last Indian reservation.

Elements of the brigade saw tours of duty in Operation Iraqi Freedom in 2005, assisting the 20th Engineer Brigade in construction and support duties. The unit deployed again to the Baghdad area as part of Multi-National Division-Baghdad during Operation Iraqi Freedom in 2007 and 2008. Missions of the brigade have been widely varied, some are humanitarian in nature, others have required the training and use of the brigade's complement of sappers.

The unit was deployed to Joplin, Missouri to help secure the city in the aftermath of the 22 May 2011 EF5 tornado. During that time the unit looted the same city it was in charge of securing. According to the St. Louis dispatch. In a telephone interview, Brig. Gen. Randy Alewel, commander of the 35th Engineer Brigade, confirmed that members of his unit were involved in the looting.
"We conducted an investigation and disciplinary action was imposed on those soldiers," Alewel said.
But he declined to say how many soldiers were involved, the extent of the looting or what discipline they received.

References

External links
35th Engineer Brigade
The Institute of Heraldry: 35th Engineer Brigade

Engineer 035